Fernandus Lamar Vinson (born November 3, 1968)  is a former American football defensive back who played four seasons with the Cincinnati Bengals of the National Football League. He was drafted by the Cincinnati Bengals in the seventh round of the 1991 NFL Draft. He played college football at North Carolina State University and attended George Washington Carver High School in Montgomery, Alabama.

References

External links
Just Sports Stats

Living people
1968 births
Players of American football from Montgomery, Alabama
American football defensive backs
African-American players of American football
NC State Wolfpack football players
Cincinnati Bengals players